Bryodrilus is a genus of annelids belonging to the family Enchytraeidae.

Species:
 Bryodrilus ehlersi Ude, 1892

References

Annelids